Hoplerythrinus is a genus of trahiras found in Central and South America.  The currently described species in this genus are:
 Hoplerythrinus cinereus (T. N. Gill, 1858)
 Hoplerythrinus gronovii (Valenciennes, 1847)
 Hoplerythrinus unitaeniatus (Spix & Agassiz, 1829) (jeju, aimara)

References
 

Erythrinidae
Taxa named by Theodore Gill